Barbara Rapp (also known as Barbara Ambrusch-Rapp)  (born 1972) is an Austrian multi-media artist. She makes paintings, collages, and sculptures that examine women's sexuality, queerness, gender and heteronormativity, often using humor.

In 2014, Rapp was selected by the curatorium of the Fashion Art Institute Barcelona (Designer Manuel Fernandez) to represent Austria for "Fashion Art EU" at the European Parliament Brussels 2015 and European Museum of Modern Art MEAM Barcelona 2016. For Barbara Rapp fashion does not only bear a social responsibility but also reflects the current socio-cultural developments. After receiving the white dress in folkloristic "dirndl-style" from the fashion art institute it was immediately clear for her that she has to withdraw its automated categorization. Her general artistic focus is on the critical questioning of gender role models. Accordingly, she tried to create the artistic design of her dress called "Trapp 3.0" not only by contemporary re-engineering the traditional mapping of folklore but also to encourage new perspectives on female and male forms of appearance.

References

Living people
1972 births
Austrian contemporary artists
Mixed-media artists
Multimedia artists
Women multimedia artists
20th-century Austrian painters
20th-century Austrian women artists
21st-century Austrian painters
21st-century Austrian women artists